Fairmount Avenue Historic District is a national historic district located in the Spring Garden neighborhood of Philadelphia, Pennsylvania.  It encompasses 75 contributing buildings and includes commercial, residential, and industrial properties. Residential buildings include mid- to late 19th-century vernacular Late Victorian rowhouses.  Notable commercial and industrial buildings date to the early 20th century through 1930, and are in the early modern and Art Deco styles. Notable non-residential buildings include the A.F. Bernot and Brothers dye works (1900–01), Gaul, Derr, and Shearer building (1911, 1915), Security Elevator factory (1925), and the Alemite Lubricator Company offices (1925).

It was added to the National Register of Historic Places in 2002.

Definition

The boundaries and restrictions of the district were defined by City Council on May 2, 2002.

References

Buildings and structures on the National Register of Historic Places in Philadelphia
Historic districts in Philadelphia
Spring Garden, Philadelphia
Historic districts on the National Register of Historic Places in Pennsylvania